Saint Lucia competed at Manchester in 2002 in their sixth Commonwealth Games. It was the most successful games for the nation, winning their first medal.

Medals

Bronze
Athletics:
 Dominic Johnson Men's Pole Vault

See also
2002 Commonwealth Games results

References

2002
Common
Nations at the 2002 Commonwealth Games